Aparajita was Shilahara ruler of north Konkan branch from 975 CE – 1010 CE.

Aparajita may also refer to:

 Aparajita (Jain monk)
 Aparajita Mohanty, actress
 Pather Panchali (novel)
 Aparajito, film